English Turn is a bend in the Mississippi River in New Orleans, Louisiana.

Etymology
In 1699, French explorers Sauvolle and Jean-Baptiste Le Moyne de Bienville were exploring the lower Mississippi and encountered English ships.  Bienville was successful in ordering the English out of the river, and the event left the name, English Turn, on the bend.

References 

Mississippi River
New Orleans